UPS Airlines is a major American cargo airline based in Louisville, Kentucky. The second-largest cargo airline worldwide (in terms of freight volume flown), UPS Airlines flies to 815 destinations worldwide. It has been a wholly owned subsidiary of United Parcel Service since its launch in 1988.

In line with passenger airlines, UPS Airlines operates under the hub-and-spoke model. The airline's primary hub in the United States is at Louisville International Airport, where it built a 5,200,000 square foot facility known as UPS Worldport. In addition to Worldport, UPS has several secondary hubs across the United States and international hubs in Germany, China, and Hong Kong.

The pilots of UPS Airlines are represented by the Independent Pilots Association.

History

1929-1931: First UPS air service
The origin of transporting packages by air for UPS (then United Parcel Service) dates to 1929. Similar to the US Postal Service, UPS packages were transported as baggage on commercial airline flights. Many packages were shipped by the Ford Trimotors of United Airlines. After Black Tuesday and the beginning of the Great Depression, the air service would be discontinued by the end of 1931. However, the air service would lead to the expansion beyond the West Coast; in 1930, the company moved operations from Oakland to New York City and established operations in other regions across the country as well.

1950s-1970s: Packages as luggage 
After World War II, UPS (in the process of acquiring common carrier rights for every address in the United States) revisited the idea of shipping packages by air. Starting in 1953, 2-day delivery was offered on coast-to-coast packages; the service was called Blue Label Air. As before, UPS package volume was transported on commercial airline flights. Initially unprofitable, Blue Label Air became popular as its speed created enough demand to maintain a profit.

In 1975, UPS started its first international operations as it expanded into Canada, with an additional expansion into West Germany a year later.

As UPS had become an international company, access to its own cargo aircraft had become a more apparent issue. In 1976, competitor Federal Express (which owned its own fleet of jet aircraft) had turned a profit, showcasing that package delivery companies did not have to exclusively rely on commercial aircraft to transport their volume.

In 1978, the Airline Deregulation Act gave UPS a significant opportunity: the company could now establish its own airline and flying from city to city would require far fewer legislative hurdles as the federal government now encouraged competition between airlines.

1980s: Establishment of UPS Airlines 
In 1980, UPS opened its first major hub for sorting packages transported by aircraft, located in Louisville, Kentucky. Located at the westernmost point of the Eastern time zone, Louisville is accessible (by jet aircraft) across the majority of the contiguous United States in less than three hours. In contrast to chief competitor Federal Express (which owned its own aircraft), in the early 1980s, air operations of UPS were undertaken by several contractors, including Evergreen International Airlines, Interstate Airlines, Ryan Air, and Orion Air. Through its contractors, UPS flew its packages using a fleet of commercial aircraft converted to freighters, including Boeing 727-100s, 727-200s, Douglas DC-8s, and Boeing 747-100s.

In 1982, UPS introduced its Next-Day Air service, guaranteeing overnight delivery on certain packages.

To expand its flight network, UPS opened a distribution facility in Anchorage in 1985. Similar to Louisville, Anchorage was chosen for its strategic geographical position, accessible to 90% of the industrialized world in less than 9 hours flying distance.

In 1986, in an effort to obtain service rights to Japan, UPS entered into a joint venture with DHL, named International Parcel Express (IPX). IPX was rejected for use in Japan, leading UPS to purchase the DHL share of the joint venture in 1987. At the end of 1987, UPS ended the use of contract flights by Evergreen, Ryan, and Orion. Using the flight certificate intended for the IPX joint venture, the renamed UPS Airlines commenced operations in January 1988, adopting many flight crews from Orion Air.

1990s: Network expansion
At the 1988 founding of UPS Airlines, the company operated a route network serving 41 countries connecting the United States and Canada to Asia and Europe. To expand and modernize its jet fleet, at the end of 1987, UPS purchased dedicated freighter variants of the Boeing 757. In 1995, UPS purchased a second aircraft type from Boeing, the Boeing 767 freighter. The launch customer of both aircraft, UPS Airlines would purchase 75 757s and 32 767s, more than doubling the size of its aircraft fleet.

To update the oldest aircraft in its fleet, the 727-100QF conversion was introduced (QF=Quiet Freighter). In place of a hush kit, the QF conversion changed the aircraft from Pratt & Whitney JT8D to Rolls-Royce Tay turbofans.

In 1991, to gain the ability to fly domestic cargo flights within Europe, UPS entered into a partnership with Danish airline Star Air (part of the Maersk conglomerate), leasing several 727 freighters to the airline (later replaced by 757 freighters).

In the early 1990s, to add capacity to its network, UPS Airlines opened additional hubs, with primary hubs in Rockford, Illinois (Chicago) and Philadelphia; secondary hubs were opened in Dallas/Fort Worth; Columbia, South Carolina; and Ontario, California (Los Angeles).

With most of its aircraft flying primarily on weeknights, the airline was eager to find other ways to produce income from its fleet. In the 1990s, eight 727 freighters were converted (at a cost of $2.5 million each) into 727-100QC (QC=Quick Change) freighters with the ability to be re-converted into passenger aircraft for the purpose of chartered flights. After disappointing results, in 2001, UPS ended charter service with quick-change freighters, with the aircraft returned to cargo service.

2000s: Worldport and network diversification
Following the addition of primary and secondary hubs to the airline network during the 1990s, for much of the next decade, additional demand led to massive expansion of its central Louisville air hub. From 1999 to 2002, in a $1 billion expansion, the Louisville hub was doubled in size (to 4 million square feet), with the hub adapting the name of the expansion project, Worldport. As part of the 2004 purchase of Menlo Worldwide Forwarding, a second expansion was completed in 2006 to expand heavy-freight operations in the UPS systems; similar expansions were added to the largest UPS hubs in the United States. From 2006 to 2010, a third expansion added over 1 million square feet to the Worldport facility (to 5.2 million square feet) and added additional ramp space for aircraft.

During the 2000s, further efforts were made by UPS to expand its flight network. In 2000, the company acquired Challenge Air Cargo to expand its services in Latin America. In a new concept, UPS introduced several "around the world" flights; originating from Louisville, the long-distance flights have several intermediate stops in Europe, the Middle East, and Asia, before returning to Worldport. In April 2001, UPS Airlines launched its first direct flights to China, providing service six days a week. In 2004, parent company UPS acquired Menlo Worldwide Forwarding (the successor to Emery Worldwide) to expand its heavy-freight operations.

Fleet modernization 
During the 2000s, the makeup of the UPS Airlines fleet underwent considerable change. As part of a $5 billion purchase of 60 aircraft, UPS phased in its first Airbus A300F freighters in 2000 (its first Airbus aircraft). The same year, the airline announced a $2 billion purchase of 13 McDonnell Douglas MD-11F freighters (with an additional option for 22); in contrast to the A300 freighters, the MD-11s were conversions of recently retired passenger aircraft.

As part of the company rebranding from United Parcel Service to UPS in early 2003, the airline redesigned its aircraft livery, featuring the redesigned company "shield" logo on the vertical stabilizer.

In January 2005, UPS Airlines became the second airline (behind FedEx Express) to order the Airbus A380-800F, placing an order for 10 aircraft (with an option for 10 more). Configured to load three decks of freight (one more than a Boeing 747 and other widebody aircraft), the A380 freighter would have entered service from 2009 to 2012. Under the terms of the A380 purchase, UPS reduced its order for A300 aircraft from 90 aircraft to 53. To modernize its existing wide-body fleet, 11 additional MD-11Fs and 8 Boeing 747-400Fs were ordered.

In February 2007, UPS Airlines nearly doubled the size of its 767 fleet, as an order was placed for 27 additional freighters, entering service between 2009 and 2012. Following years of delays by Airbus, in March 2007, UPS ended its purchase of the Airbus A380F. Alongside the cancellation by FedEx Express, the final A380 purchase by an American-owned airline ended.

By 2007, additional MD-11s and 747-400s had entered service, leading the airline to gradually phase out its oldest aircraft from the fleet. Initially, the Boeing 727 freighters (the oldest and lowest-capacity aircraft) were retired, replaced on routes by Boeing 757 freighters. During 2008 and 2009, the 747-100 and 747-200 aircraft were retired, replaced by the 747-400s and MD-11Fs. In 2009, UPS Airlines retired its entire fleet of DC-8 aircraft; at the time, its 44 aircraft represented nearly half of the active DC-8 fleet flying worldwide.

2010s: Flying further
On February 8, 2010, UPS announced the plans to furlough at least 300 pilots in 2010 and 2011, cancelling a 2009 agreement between the company and the Independent Pilots Association. The remaining pilots not furloughed demonstrated unprecedented unity by not flying overtime while colleagues were laid off. UPS decided to reduce the furlough to 109 pilots. The final pilot furloughed was in August 2010. UPS decided to recall pilots back to work in December 2011. The furlough officially ended in May, 2014 when the first pilot furloughed returned to work. On September 1, 2016, UPS and the IPA agreed to a new 5-year contract. Key components of the agreement were: immediate increases of 14.65% and a signing bonus in place of retroactive pay; 3% annual wage increases through the span of the contract; enhanced pension benefits; crew rest enhancements, including reduced duty period limits for overnight and international flights; additional sleep facilities at major gateways; and sleep modules in UPS Boeing 767 aircraft.

In 2014, the UPS 767 fleet was modified, as all existing aircraft and all aircraft on order were fitted with winglets. While over 10 feet tall, the large winglets were optimized to reduce drag, consequently reducing fuel consumption and emissions. In 2017, 3 767-300ERs were purchased from Japan Airlines, becoming the first converted 767s for UPS.

In October 2016, UPS Airlines announced a $5.2 billion agreement to purchase 14 Boeing 747-8F freighter aircraft (with an option for 14 more). While originally planning to end production of the 747 by 2020, along with the UPS purchase, Boeing cites replacement of older aircraft, e-commerce, and demand for larger aircraft across international routes as justification for retaining the 747. In February 2018, UPS exercised its option to purchase the additional 14 747 freighters, making UPS the largest operator of the 747-8 worldwide. As part of the option, UPS also purchased 4 additional Boeing 767-300F freighters, delivered by 2022.

The introduction of the 747-8F fleet allows UPS to introduce its longest-ever flight, flying nonstop from Louisville (Worldport) to its gateway in Dubai International Airport (nearly 6,700 miles). The flight segment is part of an "around the world flight", stopping at its hub in Shenzen, China and making another stop at Ted Stevens Anchorage International Airport in Alaska before returning to Louisville.

Hubs

Each day, UPS Airlines flies to over 220 countries and territories worldwide, serving 388 airports in the United States with 936 flight segments and 378 international airports with 755 flight segments Using the traditional hub-and-spoke model, UPS Airlines operates through its central facility, Worldport, in Louisville, Kentucky. In addition, the company operates several facilities on a regional level across the United States. 
 Chicago Rockford International Airport in Rockford, Illinois, the second-largest hub of UPS Airlines in terms of average daily package volume. 85 miles northwest of Chicago, the Rockford Regional Air Hub directly serves Massachusetts, Connecticut, Rhode Island, New York, Maryland, Washington DC, Michigan, Minnesota, Texas, California, Arizona and Washington State. Approximately each hour, the facility handles 121,000 individual packages. Along with the  package-sorting facility, UPS also operates a  freight facility; the  UPS ramp has parking for 40 aircraft, the most outside of Worldport.
Columbia Metropolitan Airport in Lexington County, South Carolina is the southeastern regional cargo hub for UPS and opened in August 1996.  The hub offers next-day, second-day and third-day air service.  The buildings encompass 352,000 square feet (32,700 m2) and the 44-acre (180,000 m2) ramp was large enough to hold 22 DC-8 aircraft  (ideally up to 14 aircraft parking positions currently with newer aircraft).The hub can process 42,000 packages an hour. Flights average 10 per day, serving Alabama, California, Florida, Georgia, Hawaii, Nevada, North Carolina, South Carolina and Tennessee.
 Dallas/Fort Worth International Airport The Southwest Region Air Hub directly serves Texas, Louisiana, Mississippi, Arkansas, Oklahoma, New Mexico, Arizona, Nevada, California, Oregon, Hawaii, New York, Pennsylvania, Maryland, Delaware, Virginia and Washington, DC. Approximately each hour, the facility handles 46,000 individual packages. Along with the  package-sorting facility, UPS also operates a  freight facility.
 Louisville International Airport (Standiford Field) in Louisville, Kentucky, the primary hub of UPS Airlines and home to Worldport, the central facility for sorting domestic packages. With approximately 251 inbound and outbound flights daily, the service area for Worldport is over 200 countries worldwide. Approximately each hour, the facility handles 416,000 individual packages. Along with the  Worldport facility, UPS also operates a  freight facility at the airport. In addition, UPS Airlines is headquartered at the airport, but the parent company is headquartered in Atlanta.
 Miami International Airport in Miami-Dade County, Florida. With a service area containing primarily Central and South America, the Latin America/Caribbean Hub also handles domestic packages for the southern United States. The 36,000 square foot facility handles approximately 6,500 individual packages every hour.
 Ontario International Airport in Ontario, California. 35 miles east of Los Angeles, the West Coast Region Air Hub directly serves California, Oregon, Washington State, Idaho, Nevada, Montana, Utah, Arizona, New Mexico, Colorado, Wyoming, Kansas and Nebraska along with Alaska and Hawaii. Approximately each hour, the facility handles 67,000 individual packages. Along with the  package-sorting facility, UPS also operates a  freight facility.
 Philadelphia International Airport in Philadelphia, Pennsylvania, the second-busiest UPS facility in North America, in terms of daily flights. The East Coast Region Air Hub directly serves Maine, New Hampshire, Vermont, New York, New Jersey, Massachusetts, Connecticut, Rhode Island, Pennsylvania, Maryland, Delaware, Washington DC, Virginia, West Virginia, South Carolina, Georgia, Illinois, Minnesota, Nevada, and California. Approximately each hour, the facility handles 95,000 individual packages. Along with the  package-sorting facility, UPS also operates a  freight facility.

International hubs
UPS Airlines operates several international hubs worldwide outside of Worldport. Two are in North America with one in Europe; three are located in China (Shanghai, Shenzhen, and Hong Kong), and one at Kuala Lumpur International Airport.
 John C. Munro Hamilton International Airport in Mount Hope, Hamilton, Ontario. The Canada Air Hub provides service for the entire country of Canada. The 31,000 square foot facility handles approximately 6,000 individual packages every hour.
 Luis Muñoz Marin International Airport in San Juan, Puerto Rico.

Europe
 Cologne Bonn Airport in Cologne, Germany. Similar to Worldport, the Cologne Hub has a service area of over 200 countries; to do so, many flights chartered by the company originate from here. Second only to Worldport, the Cologne Hub handles 190,000 packages an hour in the  facility; with 76 average flights per day, it is the second-busiest UPS hub worldwide, in terms of daily flights.
 East Midlands Airport in East Midlands, Derby, United Kingdom.

China
 Hong Kong International Airport in Chek Lap Kok, Hong Kong. With a service area containing transferring packages to Asia from Europe (and vice versa), the 45,000 square foot facility sorts approximately 4,500 packages an hour.
 Shanghai Pudong International Airport in Pudong, Shanghai, China. Similar to the Shenzhen facility, the Shanghai facility organizes all UPS packages traveling into and out of China from destinations worldwide; approximately 17,000 packages an hour are sorted.
 Shenzhen Bao'an International Airport in Shenzhen, China. At 960,000 square feet, it is one of the largest facilities, meant to sort all packages traveling into and out of Asia, as well as handle packages traveling within Asia; approximately 18,000 packages an hour are sorted.

Fleet

As of February 2022, UPS Airlines has an active fleet of 290 aircraft. Operating an all-jet fleet, the airline does not own any turboprop, short-haul aircraft; as it needs such aircraft, they are chartered from companies such as Air Cargo Carriers and Ameriflight.

UPS Airlines will become the world's largest operator of the Boeing 747-8F (following its 2018 purchase); it is the second-largest operator of the Boeing 757 and 767, McDonnell Douglas MD-11F, and Airbus A300. The airline was also the largest operator of the Douglas DC-8 for a number of years, as it operated nearly half the active examples of the type worldwide at the time of its 2009 retirement.

Branding/livery
While UPS is distinguished by its UPS Brown delivery vehicles, to reduce heat absorption and save weight, brown has been reduced to a secondary color on UPS Airlines aircraft. During its existence, the airline has used two liveries on its aircraft fleet. In line with the long-running UPS tradition of not displaying vehicle-manufacturer branding, UPS Airlines aircraft do not have any markings indicating aircraft type.

1988-2003: United Parcel Service 
From its 1988 formation to 2003, UPS Airlines used a bi-color brown and white livery on its aircraft. Most of the fuselage was painted white with the vertical stabilizer painted the same UPS Brown as its delivery vehicles. On the centerline of the fuselage, a brown cheatline was applied; as its 727, DC-8, MD-11, and 747 fleet were converted passenger aircraft, this was done to further cover up the passenger windows. On the forward third of the fuselage above the cheatline was painted: "United Parcel Service".

2003-2014: Worldwide Services: Synchronizing the world of commerce 
In 2003, to commemorate the official name change of United Parcel Service to UPS, the company logo was given a redesign along with a redesign of the UPS Airlines livery. With nearly the entire fuselage painted white, the brown portion of the tail was changed to sweep above the rear fuselage, coming to a point near the front of the wing; the white and brown portions of the fuselage were separated by a gold stripe. In place of the "United Parcel Service" was painted in two lines: "Worldwide Services: Synchronizing the world of commerce". The only aircraft in the UPS Airlines fleet that did not adopt the "Worldwide Services" livery were the Boeing 747-100, Boeing 747-200, along with the majority of the Boeing 727 fleet, as these aircraft were in the process of being phased out in the mid-2000s.

2014-present: Worldwide Services 
In 2014, in line with UPS delivery vehicles, UPS Airlines phased in a revised version of its "Worldwide Services" livery, removing the "Synchronizing the world of commerce" phrase from the fuselage. The UPS emblem and gold body stripe painted brighter, with the gradient shading removed from the emblem. Along with aircraft entering service, the livery was phased into the airline fleet as aircraft underwent repainting for maintenance, with Dean Baldwin Painting at Grissom Aeroplex in Peru, Indiana (a 40-minute flight from Worldport) updating the exteriors.

Operations

Hot-spare program
As a safeguard against failure of service resulting from weather, mechanical failure, or any unexpected reasons, for most of its existence, UPS Airlines has operated a "hot-spare" contingency program.  Similar in intent to the scrambling of military aircraft, the hot-spare program is designed for a flight crew to takeoff with an empty aircraft within 30 minutes of a request for service.  At any given time, 14 different aircraft are designated at 7 UPS Airlines hubs, equalizing flight distance and time between locations.  Four of the six aircraft types flown by the airline are used for hot-spare service (excluding the 747-400 and 747-8).

To ensure that an aircraft can be flight-ready within 30 minutes, hot-spare aircraft are preflighted and fueled ahead of time.  In 2014, UPS launched 275 hot spares in total, allowing 1.5 million packages to make service on time, making almost $32 million in revenue.

Continuous descent approach (CDA) 

, UPS Airlines was experimenting with a Global Positioning System-based landing procedure, called continuous descent approach at the Worldport, replacing the traditional holding pattern and step-wise descent. CDA is used to reduce the time and fuel needed to approach a runway and land by eliminating the need to alternatively reduce and increase throttle to descend and level off. UPS Airlines estimates that this procedure saves an average of 250 to 465 lbs (110 to 210 kilograms) of fuel per flight. CDA is part of the Federal Aviation Administration's long-term "Next-Gen" air traffic control plan.

Accidents and incidents
UPS Airlines has experienced two fatal crashes which resulted in four fatalities.

See also
Air cargo
United Parcel Service (Parent company)
UPS Flight Forward
FedEx Express
DHL Aviation

References

External links

 UPS Airlines Pressroom

Airlines for America members
Airlines established in 1988
Airlines based in Kentucky
Cargo airlines of the United States
Companies based in Louisville, Kentucky
Airlines
1988 establishments in Kentucky
American companies established in 1988
Louisville International Airport